Leonard E. Yoswein (September 8, 1920 – February 25, 2011) was an American politician who served in the New York State Assembly from 1961 to 1968.

He died on February 25, 2011, in Brooklyn, New York City, New York at age 90.

References

1920 births
2011 deaths
Democratic Party members of the New York State Assembly